This is a list of progestogens (progesterone and progestins) and formulations that are approved by the  in the United States. Progestogens are used as hormonal contraceptives, in hormone replacement therapy for menopausal symptoms, and in the treatment of gynecological disorders.

For contraception

Combined contraceptives

Combined oral contraceptive pills

 Drospirenone and Estetrol (Nextstellis)
 Estradiol valerate and dienogest (Natazia)
 Ethinylestradiol and desogestrel (Bekyree, Cyclessa, Desogen, Emoquette, Enskyce, Isibloom, Kariva, Kimidess, Mircette, Ortho-Cept, Pimtrea, Velivet, Viorele, Volnea)
 Ethinylestradiol and drospirenone [and/or levomefolate calcium] (Beyaz, Loryna, Melamisa, Nikki, Safyral, Syeda, Yaela, Yasmin, Yaz)
 Ethinylestradiol and etynodiol diacetate (Demulen 1/35-21, Demulen 1/35-28, Demulen 1/50-21, Demulen 1/50-28, Kelnor, Zovia 1/35E-21, Zovia 1/35E-28, Zovia 1/50E-21, Zovia 1/50E-28)
 Ethinylestradiol and levonorgestrel (Alesse, Altavera, Ashlyna, Aviane-21, Aviane-28, Ayuna, Daysee, Elifemme, Enpresse-21, Enpresse-28, Falmina, Fayosim, Introvale, Kurvelo, Lessina-21, Lessina-28, Levlite, Levonest, Levonorgestrel and Ethinyl Estradiol, Levora 0.15/30-21, Levora 0.15/30-28, LoSeasonique, Lybrel, Marlissa, Myzilra, Nordette-21, Nordette-28, Orsythia, Portia-21, Portia-28, Preven Emergency Contraceptive Kit, Quartette, Quasense, Seasonale, Seasonique, Setlakin, Triphasil-21, Triphasil-28, Trivora-21, Trivora-28, Vienva)
 Ethinylestradiol and norethisterone [and/or ferrous fumarate (Fe)] (Alyacen 1/35, Alyacen 7/7/7, Alyacen 777, Aranelle, Balziva-21, Balziva-28, Brevicon 21-Day, Brevicon 28-Day, Briellyn, Cyclafem 0.5/35, Cyclafem 1/35, Cyclafem 7/7/7, Dasetta 1/35, Dasetta 7/7/7, Femcon Fe, Gencept 10/11-21, Gencept 10/11-28, Gildagia, Kaitlib Fe, Modicon 21, Modicon 28, N.E.E. 1/35 21, N.E.E. 1/35 28, Norcept-E 1/35 21, Norcept-E 1/35 28, Norethin 1/35E-21, Norethin 1/35E-28, Norinyl 1+35 21-Day, Norinyl 1+35 28-Day, Norquest Fe, Nortrel 0.5/35-21, Nortrel 0.5/35-28, Nortrel 1/35-21, Nortrel 1/35-28, Nortrel 7/7/7, Ortho-Novum 1/35-21, Ortho-Novum 1/35-28, Ortho-Novum 10/11-21, Ortho-Novum 10/11-28, Ortho-Novum 7/14-21, Ortho-Novum 7/14-28, Ortho-Novum 7/7/7-21, Ortho-Novum 7/7/7-28, Ovcon-35, Ovcon-50, Philith, Pirmella 1/35, Pirmella 7/7/7, Tri-Norinyl 21-Day, Tri-Norinyl 28-Day, Vyfemla, Wera)
 Ethinylestradiol and norethisterone acetate [and/or ferrous fumarate (Fe)] (Activella, Alyacen 1/35, Alyacen 7/7/7, Alyacen 777, Amabelz, Aranelle, Aurovela 1.5/30, Aurovela 1/20, Aurovela 24 Fe, Aurovela Fe 1.5/30, Aurovela Fe 1/20, Aurovela Fe, Aygestin, Balziva-21, Balziva-28, Blisovi 24 Fe, Blisovi Fe 1.5/30, Blisovi Fe 1/20, Brevicon 21-Day, Brevicon 28-Day, Briellyn, Camila, Chabelina Fe, Charlotte 24 Fe, Combipatch, Cyclafem 0.5/35, Cyclafem 1/35, Cyclafem 7/7/7, Cyonanz, Dasetta 1/35, Dasetta 7/7/7, Errin, Estrostep 21, Estrostep Fe, Femcon Fe, Femhrt, Finzala, Fyavolv, Gemmily, Gencept 10/11-21, Gencept 10/11-28, Gildagia, Gildess 1.5/30, Gildess 1/20, Gildess 24 Fe, Gildess Fe 1.5/30, Gildess Fe 1/20, Hailey 1.5/30, Hailey 24 Fe, Hailey Fe 1.5/30, Hailey Fe 1/20, Heather, Incassia, Jencycla, Jinteli, Junel 1.5/30, Junel 1/20, Junel 21, Junel Fe 1.5/30, Junel Fe 1/20, Junel Fe 24, Junel Fe 28, Kaitlib Fe, Larin 1.5/30, Larin 1/20, Larin 24 Fe, Larin Fe 1.5/30, Larin Fe 1/20, Leribane, Lo Larin Fe, Lo Loestrin Fe, Lo Minastrin Fe, Lo-Blisovi Fe, Loestrin 21 1.5/30, Loestrin 21 1/20, Loestrin 21, Loestrin 24 Fe, Loestrin Fe 1.5/30, Loestrin Fe 1/20, Loestrin Fe 28, Lomedia 24 Fe, Lupaneta Pack, Melodetta 24 Fe, Merzee, Mibelas 24 Fe, Microgestin 1.5/30, Microgestin 1/20, Microgestin Fe 1.5/30, Microgestin Fe 1/20, Micronor, Minastrin 24 Fe, Modicon 21, Modicon 28, Myfembree, N.E.E. 1/35 21, N.E.E. 1/35 28, Nexesta Fe, Nor-Qd, Norcept-E 1/35 21, Norcept-E 1/35 28, Norethin 1/35E-21, Norethin 1/35E-28, Norethin 1/50M-21, Norethin 1/50M-28, Norinyl, Norinyl 1+35 21-Day, Norinyl 1+35 28-Day, Norinyl 1+50 21-Day, Norinyl 1+50 28-Day, Norinyl 1+80 21-Day, Norinyl 1+80 28-Day, Norlestrin 21 1/50, Norlestrin 21 2.5/50, Norlestrin 28 1/50, Norlestrin Fe 1/50, Norlestrin Fe 2.5/50, Norlutate, Norlutin, Norminest Fe, Norquest Fe, Nortrel 0.5/35-21, Nortrel 0.5/35-28, Nortrel 1/35-21, Nortrel 1/35-28, Nortrel 7/7/7, Nylia 1/35, Nylia 7/7/7, Oriahnn (Copackaged), Ortho-Novum 1/35-21, Ortho-Novum 1/35-28, Ortho-Novum 1/50 21, Ortho-Novum 1/50 28, Ortho-Novum 1/80 21, Ortho-Novum 1/80 28, Ortho-Novum 2-21, Ortho-Novum 7/7/7-21, Ortho-Novum 7/7/7-28, Ortho-Novum 7/14-21, Ortho-Novum 7/14-28, Ortho-Novum 10-21, Ortho-Novum 10/11-21, Ortho-Novum 10/11-28, Ovcon-35, Ovcon-50, Philith, Pirmella 1/35, Pirmella 7/7/7, Taytulla, Tri-Legest 21, Tri-Legest 21 , Tri-Legest Fe, Tri-Norinyl 21-Day, Tri-Norinyl 28-Day, Vyfemla, Wera)
 Ethinylestradiol and norgestimate (Estarylla, Mili, Mono-Linyah, Ortho Cyclen-21, Ortho Cyclen-28, Ortho Tri-Cyclen, Ortho Tri-Cyclen 21, Ortho Tri-Cyclen 28, Ortho Tri-Cyclen Lo, Previfem, Sprintec, Tri Lo Sprintec, Tri-Estarylla, Tri-Linyah, Tri-Lo-Estarylla, Tri-Lo-Linyah, Tri-Mili, Tri-Previfem, Tri-Sprintec)
 Ethinylestradiol and norgestrel (Cryselle, Elinest, Lo/Ovral, Lo/Ovral-28, Low-Ogestrel-21, Low-Ogestrel-28, Ogestrel 0.5/50-21, Ogestrel 0.5/50-28, Ovral, Ovral-28)
 Mestranol and norethisterone (Norinyl 1+50 28-Day)

Transdermal patches

 Ethinylestradiol and norelgestromin (Ortho Evra, Xulane)

Vaginal rings

 Ethinylestradiol and etonogestrel (NuvaRing)

Combined injectable contraceptives

Estradiol cypionate and medroxyprogesterone acetate (Lunelle; 5 mg / 25 mg) was previously available in the U.S. but was discontinued.

Progestogen-only contraceptives

Progestogen-only pills

 Norethisterone (Camila, Errin, Heather, Incassia, Jencycla, Micronor, Nor-QD) – 0.35 mg
 Drospirenone (Slynd) - 4 mg available as of 2019

Norgestrel (Ovrette; 0.075 mg) was previously available in the U.S. but was discontinued.

Postcoital emergency contraceptive pills

 Levonorgestrel (Athentia Next, Fallback Solo, Her Style, Opcicon One-Step, Plan B, Plan B One-Step) – 0.75 mg, 1.5 mg

Progestogen-only injectable contraceptives

 Medroxyprogesterone acetate (Depo-Provera) – 150 mg/mL (intramuscular)
 Medroxyprogesterone acetate (Depo-SubQ Provera 104) – 104 mg/0.65 mL (subcutaneous)

Intrauterine devices

 Levonorgestrel (Kyleena, Liletta, Mirena, Skyla) – 13.5 mg/device, 19.5 mg/device, 52 mg/device

Progesterone (Progestasert; 38 mg/device) was previously available in the U.S. but was discontinued.

Subcutaneous implants

 Etonogestrel (Implanon, Nexplanon) – 68 mg/implant
 Levonorgestrel (Jadelle, Norplant, Norplant System in Plastic Container) – 36 mg/implant, 75 mg/implant

For other uses

Combined with estrogen

Oral pills
 Conjugated estrogens and medroxyprogesterone acetate (Premphase (Premarin, Cycrin 14/14), Premphase 14/14, Prempro, Prempro (Premarin, Cycrin), Prempro/Premphase) – 0.3 mg / 1.5 mg; 0.45 mg / 1.5 mg; 0.625 mg / 2.5 mg; 0.625 mg / 5 mg
 Estradiol and drospirenone (Angeliq) – 0.5 mg / 0.25 mg; 1 mg / 0.5 mg
 Estradiol and norethisterone acetate (Activella, Amabelz) – 1 mg / 0.5 mg; 0.5 mg / 0.1 mg
 Ethinylestradiol and norethisterone acetate (FemHRT) – 25 μg / 0.5 mg

Estradiol/progesterone (TX-001HR), a combination of estradiol and progesterone in oil-filled capsules, is currently pending approval.

Estradiol and norgestimate (Prefest; 1 mg / 90 μg) was previously available in the U.S. but was discontinued.

Transdermal patches
 Estradiol and levonorgestrel (Climara Pro) – 45 μg/24 hours / 15 μg/24 hours
 Estradiol and norethisterone acetate (Combipatch) – 50 μg/24 hours / 0.14 mg/24 hours; 50 μg/24 hours / 0.25 mg/24 hours

Progestogen-only

Oral pills
 Drospirenone (Slynd) – 4 mg
 Medroxyprogesterone acetate (Amen, Curretab, Cycrin, Provera) – 2.5 mg, 5 mg, 10 mg
 Megestrol acetate (Megace) – 20 mg, 40 mg – approved specifically for the treatment of breast and endometrial cancer and for the treatment of anorexia, cachexia, and weight loss in patients with 
 Norethisterone acetate (Aygestin, Norlutate) – 5 mg
 Progesterone (Prometrium) – 100 mg, 200 mg, 300 mg

Atypical:

 Danazol (Danocrine) – 50 mg, 100 mg, 200 mg – approved specifically for the treatment of endometriosis

Oral suspensions
 Megestrol acetate (Megace, Megace ES) – 40 mg/mL, 125 mg/mL – approved specifically for the treatment of anorexia, cachexia, and weight loss in patients with

Vaginal tablets
 Progesterone (Endometrin) – 100 mg

Vaginal gels
 Progesterone (Crinone) – 4%, 8%

Intramuscular injectables
 Hydroxyprogesterone caproate (Delalutin, Makena, Makena Preservative Free) – 125 mg/mL, 250 mg/mL
 Medroxyprogesterone acetate (Depo-Provera) – 400 mg/mL – approved specifically for the treatment of endometrial/renal cancer
 Progesterone (Progesterone) – 50 mg/mL (25 mg/mL discontinued)

Miscellaneous
 Norethisterone acetate and leuprorelin (Lupaneta Pack) – 5 mg norethisterone acetate oral pills, 3.75 mg/vial, 11.25 mg/vial leuprorelin for intramuscular injection – approved specifically for the treatment of painful endometriosis

Not available in the United States

 Acetomepregenol
 Algestone acetophenide
 Allylestrenol
 Chlormadinone acetate
 Cyproterone acetate
 Demegestone
 Dimethisterone
 Dydrogesterone
 Ethisterone
 Gestodene
 Gestonorone caproate
 Gestrinone
 Haloprogesterone
 Hydroxyprogesterone acetate
 Hydroxyprogesterone heptanoate
 Lynestrenol
 Medrogestone
 Nomegestrol acetate
 Norethisterone enanthate
 Noretynodrel
 Norgesterone
 Norgestrienone
 Normethandrone
 Norvinisterone
 Oxendolone
 Pentagestrone acetate
 Promegestone
 Quingestanol acetate
 Quingestrone
 Segesterone acetate
 Tibolone
 Trengestone
 Trimegestone

See also
 List of sex-hormonal medications available in the United States
 List of progestogens
 List of progestogen esters
 Oral contraceptive formulations
 Estradiol-containing oral contraceptive

References

External links

Hormonal contraception
Progestogens